Alois Vocásek (13 April 1896 – 9 August 2003) was the last surviving Czechoslovakian veteran of the World War I and the last survivor of the Battle of Zborov in Ukraine. He was one of thousands of Czechs and Slovaks who broke with the Austro-Hungarian monarchy to fight for the future Czechoslovak state as members of the Czechoslovak Legions. He was later controversial because of his membership in the Czech fascist/nationalist organisation Vlajka in the 1930s.

He was the oldest member of the Seventh-day Adventist Church in the Czech Republic. He is buried at the Olšany Cemetery.

See also

 List of last surviving World War I veterans by country

References

1896 births
2003 deaths
People from Kolín District
Czechoslovak military personnel of World War I
Czechoslovak Legion personnel
People of the Russian Civil War
White movement people
Men centenarians
Czech centenarians
Czech nationalists
Czech anti-communists
Czech Seventh-day Adventists